Amphizoa is a genus of aquatic beetles in the suborder Adephaga, placed in its own monogeneric family, Amphizoidae.  There are five known species of Amphizoa, three in western North America and two in the eastern Palearctic. They are sometimes referred to by the common name troutstream beetles.

Description

Troutstream beetles have a characteristic appearance. They are relatively large, oval, slightly convex, dull black to piceus. The head is broad with a quadrate shape and small round eyes. The antenna is filiform, rather short with 11 segments. The pronotum is significantly narrower than the elytra and with lateral margins slightly crenulated; the prosternal processes are broad and flat, rounded to truncate at the apex; the elytra are vaguely striate and have a series of short spines of unknown function. The legs are not well adapted for swimming, and lack long swimming setae. The hind coxae extend to the lateral margin of the abdomen and the tarsal formula is 5-5-5.<ref name = "Dettner">Dettner, K. 2005: 7.4. Amphizoidae LeConte, 1853. Pp. 81-85 in: Beutel, R.G.; Leschen, R.A.B. (volume eds.) Coleoptera, beetles. Volume 1: Morphology and systematics (Archostemata, Adephaga, Myxophaga, Polyphaga partim). In: Kristensen, N.P. & Beutel, R.G. (eds.) Handbook of Zoology. A Natural History of the Phyla of the Animal Kingdom. Volume IV. Arthropoda: Insecta. Part 38. Berlin, New York: Walter de Gruyter.</ref>

 Known species of Amphizoa 
The genus Amphizoa contains the following known species:Amphizoa davidisAmphizoa insolensAmphizoa leconteiAmphizoa sinicaAmphizoa striataBiology
Troutstream beetles can be found in streams and rivers in mountain regions of China, North Korea and western North America. Streams are often cold and medium to fast flowing, and the beetles can be found clinging to rocks, woody debris or at margins. Both adults and larvae are predators, especially on stonefly larvae but occasionally on other aquatic insects. Larvae may also scavenge dead insects.

When disturbed, adults exude a yellowish fluid from the anus, with an odor described as that of cantaloupe or decaying wood, probably as a defense mechanism against predators like frogs and toads.

Phylogeny and evolution
Amphizoidae share some plesiomorphic features with Carabidae, such as slender ambulatory legs, and other characteristics with Dytiscidae, such as large sensorial lobes on the epipharynx. In an analysis based on the genes 18S rRNA, 16S rRNA and cytochrome oxidase I, Amphizoidae was placed as a sister group of a clade comprising the newly described family Aspidytidae, Paelobiidae(=Hygrobiidae) and Dysticidae. An analysis based on a morphological character matrix also came to this conclusion. However, two other studies with more genes have placed Amphizoidae as sister group to Aspidytidae.Balke, M., Ribera, I. & Beutel, R. G. 2005. The systematic position of Aspidytidae, the diversification of Dytiscoidea (Coleoptera, Adephaga) and the phylogenetic signal of third codon positions. Journal of Zoological Systematics and Evolutionary Research 43 (3): 223-242 With Aspidytidae and Amphizoa share the same morphology of the apical part of the pro-sternal process and the mesocoxal cavities. The phylogeny within Amphizoa has been analysed in two studies based on morphological characters and they suggested that A. davidis is an isolated species and sister to the remaining four species as follows (A davidis, (A. insolens, (A. striata, (A. sinica & A. lecontei)))).Edwards, J. G. 1951. Amphizoidae (Coleoptera) of the World. The Wasmann Journal of Biology vol. 8, no. 3

References

External links
Amphizoa insolens. California Beetles Project.

Further reading
 Philips, K. T. and W. Xie. "Amphizoidae", in Arnett, R. H. and M. C. Thomas, American Beetles'' (CRC Press, 2001), vol. 1

Adephaga genera
Palearctic insects
Taxa named by John Lawrence LeConte